Hirschbach may refer to:

Hirschbach, Lower Austria, a municipality in Lower Austria, Austria
Hirschbach im Mühlkreis, a municipality in Upper Austria, Austria
Hirschbach, Bavaria, a municipality in Bavaria, Germany
Hirschbach (Gersprenz), a river in Hesse, Germany

People with the surname
Wolfgang Hirschbach (1570–1620), German legal scholar

German-language surnames